The 2017–18 Irish Super League season was the 45th running of Basketball Ireland's premier men's basketball competition. The season featured 12 teams from across the Republic of Ireland and Northern Ireland, with the regular season beginning on 15 September 2017 and ending on 17 March 2018 with UCD Marian claiming their first title in 40 years. Templeogue were victorious in the National Cup, while Tralee Warriors defended their Champions Trophy title.

Teams

Regular season

Regular season play-off final
A regular season play-off final was scheduled after Killester and UCD Marian finished joint first at the top of the table with 17 wins and five losses.

Champions Trophy

Bracket

Quarter-finals

Semi-finals

Final

National Cup

Round 1

Round 2

Semi-finals

Final

Source: Basketball Ireland

Awards

Player of the Month

Coach of the Month

Statistics leaders
Stats as of the end of the regular season

Regular season
 Player of the Year: Dee Proby (DCU Saints)
 Young Player of the Year: Eoin Rockall (Maree)
 Coach of the Year: Ioannis Liapakis (UCD Marian)
 All-Star First Team:
 Ciaran Roe (Killester)
 Adrian O'Sullivan (UCC Demons)
 Royce Williams (Killester)
 Dee Proby (DCU Saints)
 Jason Killeen (Templeogue)
 All-Star Second Team:
 Trae Pemberton (Tralee Warriors)
 Conor Meany (UCD Marian)
 Lorcan Murphy (Templeogue)
 Mike Garrow (UCD Marian)
 Luis Filiberto Hoyos (Killester)
 All-Star Third Team:
 Isaac Westbrooks (Swords Thunder)
 Neil Randolph (Templeogue)
 Dan James (UCD Marian)
 Kieran Donaghy (Tralee Warriors)
 Lehmon Colbert (UCC Demons)

References

External links
2017–18 team changes at basketballireland.ie
Pre-season info at basketballireland.ie
National Cup draw at basketballireland.ie

Irish
Super League (Ireland) seasons
Basket
Basket